Lusail Sports Club  is a Qatari football team representing the Lusail district of Doha City playing in the Qatari Second Division

It was officially granted club status by the Qatar Football Association in September 2019, allowing it to participate in the 2019–20 season of the Qatari Second Division.

Current squad

The current squad is as follows.

As of Qatari Second Division:

References

External links
 Lusail SC at Kooora.com

Lusail
2014 establishments in Qatar
Association football clubs established in 2014